Cori is both a surname and a given name. Notable people with the name include:

Surname
Carl Ferdinand Cori (1896–1984), Austrian-American biochemist
Deysi Cori (born 1993), Peruvian chess player
Gerty Cori (1896–1957), American biochemist
Jorge Cori (born 1995), Peruvian chess player
Sacha Cori (born 1989), Italian footballer

Given name: Cori
Cori Alexander (born 1985), American women's soccer player and artistic photographer
Cori Blakebrough (born 1967), Canadian basketball player
Cori Bush (born 1976), American politician, registered nurse, pastor, and activist
Cori Close (born 1971), American basketball coach
Cori Gauff (born 2004), American tennis player known as Coco Gauff
 Cori Henry (born 1976), British sprinter
 Cori Morris (born 1971), Canadian curler
Cori Schumacher (born 1977), American surfer, social justice advocate, scholar, and former politician
Cori Thomas, American author, dramatist, playwright, and screenwriter of Liberian and Brazilian descent
Cori Yarckin (born 1982), American actress and singer
Cori Zarek, American lawyer, public interest technologist, and adjunct professor of media law
Given name: Corri

 Corri English (born 1978), American actress
 Corri Wilson (born 1965), Scottish politician

See also 

 Corri, a surname
 Cory, a given name and surname
 Corey, a given name and surname